The 2020–21 Birmingham City W.F.C. season was the club's 53rd season in existence and their 10th in the FA Women's Super League, the highest level of the football pyramid, having been founding members of the league in 2011. Along with competing in the WSL, the club will contested two domestic cup competitions: the FA Cup and the League Cup.

Carla Ward was appointed manager ahead of the new season on 13 August 2020, taking over from Charlie Baxter who had been put in charge on an interim basis following the departure of Marta Tejedor during the previous campaign.

On 5 April 2021, it was revealed a formal letter signed by all Birmingham City players had been sent to the club's board with a list of complaints including concerns about working conditions, lack of gym facilities, medical support, travel provisions, squad size and part-time coaching staff which would contradict WSL licensing rules. Numerous requests by the squad to meet with the board had previously been rejected and there was a fear that the club was not committed to funding a full-time team for the following season with only three players under contract past June 2021. The letter received support from the PFA as well as mass social media coverage from former and current players around the WSL. On 8 April, the letter was addressed in a club statement with the board expressing their disappointment an internal issue was made public, refuting the factual accuracy of many of the points reported and citing the ongoing COVID-19 pandemic as context for both the financial strain and practical difficulties with regards to providing adequate facilities but reaffirming they were still committed to supporting the team. The statement also confirmed a deal had been agreed to host the women's team's home games at the club's main St Andrew's stadium for the 2021–22 season.

On 14 May 2021, Ward announced her resignation effective as of the team's final game of the season on 16 May.

Squad

FA Women's Super League

Results summary

Results by matchday

Results

League table

Women's FA Cup 

As a member of the top two tiers, Birmingham City will enter the FA Cup in the fourth round proper. Originally scheduled to take place on 31 January 2021, it was delayed due to COVID-19 restrictions. Due to the delay, the competition only reached the fifth round before the end of the season. It resumed at the quarter-final stage the following season on 29 September 2021, at which point Scott Booth was Birmingham City manager.

FA Women's League Cup 

Group E

Ranking of second-placed teams

Squad statistics

Appearances 

Starting appearances are listed first, followed by substitute appearances after the + symbol where applicable.

|-
|colspan="14"|Joined during 2021–22 season but competed in the postponed 2020–21 FA Cup:

|-
|colspan="14"|Players who appeared for the club but left during the season:

|}

Transfers

Transfers in

Loans in

Transfers out

References 

Birmingham City
Birmingham City L.F.C. seasons